José Garvida Flores (December 9, 1900 – August 12, 1944) was an Ilocano poet and playwright, from Bangui, Ilocos Norte, Philippines. 

His works include Wayawaya ken Sabsabali a Dandaniw (Liberty and a Collection of Poems), Pitik Ti Puso (Heartbeat), Kaanunto (When Will It Be), Tanda Ti Ayanayat (In Remembrance of Love), and plays such as Dagiti Ayayat ni Dr. Rizal (The Many Loves of Dr. Rizal), and Ayat Iti Ili ken Dadduma Pay a Drama (Love of Country and Other Dramas).

His articles were not only written in Ilocano (Bannawag* and Ti Bagnos*), but also in English (The Tribune), and in Spanish (La Lucha* and El Norte*), etc. He was also editor-in-chief of Dangadang*, another Ilocano newspaper, which he published together with fellow Ilocano, cleric-politician Santiago S. Fonacier.

Literary works

Poetry 
 Filipinas, Nadayag a Filipinas (Philippines, Beloved Philippines) – this literary piece is sung during Independence Day, and during ceremonies at the Iglesia Filipina Independiente (Philippine Independent Church).
  No Awan Siit, Awan Balangat (If There is No Thorn, There is No Crown)
 Pitik Ti Puso - Napili a Dandaniw a Mairukney iti Daga a Nakayanakan; Dandaniw iti Nalibuos a Filipina Maipapan iti Natanok a Biag (Heartbeat - Selected Poems Dedicated to the Land of Birth; A Poem about a Charming Filipina of Good Moral Values) / 29p, Laoag, I.N. 1928
 Wayawaya ken Sabsabali a Dandaniw (Liberty and A Collection of Poems) / 24p, Dangadang, Bangui, I.N. 1931
 Kaanunto (When Will It Be)
 Tanda Ti Ayanayat (In Remembrance of Love)

Dramas / Plays / Zarzuela Ilocana 
 Teriang, a colourful village maiden's life which hit local theatres because of its natural and well-organized dialogue.
 Ayat Iti Ili ken Dadduma Pay a Drama (Love of Country and Other Dramas) / with English translation
 Dagiti Ayayat ni Dr. Rizal - Maipabuya a Putar ni José Garvida Flores (The Many Loves of Dr. Rizal - Play written by José Garvida Flores) / 51p, Dangadang, Manila 1940

Translations 
Rudyard Kipling’s If— and José Rizal’s Mi Último Adios both into the Ilokano/Ilocano language, among many others.

20th–21st century 

Some of his works are now listed and kept in Philippine eLib, a collaborative project of the National Library of the Philippines (NLP), University of the Philippines (UP), Department of Science and Technology (DOST), Department of Agriculture (DA), and the Commission on Higher Education (CHED).
 
During his term as congressman, the late Rep. Antonio Raquiza passed a bill to rename Sentinella Hill in Bangui as José Garvida Flores Park (its construction was initiated and government-funded but was never completed and recognized as such).

Wayawaya Ken Sabsabali a Dandaniw, is featured at the Museo Ilocos Norte in Laoag City, Ilocos Norte, Philippines.

References

People from Ilocos Norte
Filipino writers
Ilocano-language writers
1944 deaths
1900 births
Ilocano people
Philippine Law School alumni
Members of the Philippine Independent Church